Stenoma vita is a moth in the family Depressariidae. It was described by August Busck in 1911. It is found in Brazil and the Guianas.

The wingspan is 24–25 mm. The forewings are light straw yellow, with a large brown shade resting on the dorsal edge and covering most of the wing. The brown shades gradually into the yellow and leaves the base, costal, and terminal edge pure yellow. On the costal edge are two very small dark brown dots, one on the middle and one at apical sixth. The hindwings are light straw yellow.

References

Moths described in 1911
Stenoma